The VisionAire VA-10 Vantage is a prototype single-engined light business-jet (or "very light jet") designed and developed by the American company VisionAire Jets Corporation. Originally planned for production in the late 1990s, the original VisionAire Corporation failed in 2003. The project was acquired by Eviation Jets, which planned to produce it as the redesigned EV-20 Vantage Jet. Eviation also failed, and in 2012 the design was relaunched by a revived VisionAire under its original design.

Design and development
The Vantage is currently being developed by VisionAire Jets, LLC, a successor company to VisionAire Corporation, founded in 1988, to fill a perceived gap in the light aircraft market between high performance piston-engined aircraft and twin-engined executive jets. The Vantage differed from contemporary executive jets in that it was powered by a single engine, a Pratt & Whitney Canada JT15D turbofan buried in the rear fuselage, fed by twin air-inlets above the fuselage. It was of all-composite construction, and its wing was forward swept to reduce drag and to allow an unobstructed cabin by mounting the wing spar behind the cabin. It was planned to sell the Vantage for $1.65 million, compared with $3.3 million for the Cessna CitationJet.

The first prototype, a proof-of-concept aircraft intended to confirm the design's handling, was designed and built by Burt Rutan's Scaled Composites in Mojave, California. It made its maiden flight on November 16, 1996. Flight testing revealed several handling and aerodynamic problems, which resulted in a redesign of the aircraft in December 1998.

Delays to the program continued, while costs mounted, and in January 2003, with the company having already spent $110 million, requiring another $125 million to complete certification and owing $35 million, a federal judge ordered VisionAire liquidated to pay its debts. The Vantage design was purchased by Eviation, for use as a basis for the twin-engined EV-20 Vantage Jet design.

The Vantage Proof-of-Concept (POC) aircraft is currently located at the VisionAire Jets facility at the Hickory Airport, Hickory North Carolina.

Eviation EV-20 Vantage Jet
In the executive configuration it would have provided room for eight passengers, or ten commuter passengers. It would incorporate Garmin G1000 avionics, and would be made entirely from composite materials. kBky 2006, initial review of the EV-20 design were completed and construction of a prototype aircraft was expected to begin, utilizing an outside fabricator for construction of the prototype.

Return to VisionAire
The redesign of the Vantage from a single- to a twin-engine design proved troublesome; the company failed to progress with the development of the type, and in 2012 the EV-20 was repurchased by VisionAire; the aircraft's design was returned to a single-engined configuration, and VisionAire stated in early 2013 that they planned to construct the Vantage in a factory in Newton, North Carolina, with the prototype scheduled to fly in 2014. However, at the end of 2015 no further progress has been announced; latest update on the company's website is dated March 2013.

Specifications (VisionAire Vantage)

See also

Notes

References

 Higdon, Dave. "FBO Light Jet Review". Wings Over Kansas. Retrieved January 9, 2011
Jackson, Paul. Jane's All The World's Aircraft 2003–2004. Coulsdon, UK: Jane's Information Group, 2003. 
 "New Vantage boss rethinks powerplant". Flight International, November 11–17, 2003. p. 4
 "Vantage jet prepares for first flight". Flight International, November 20–26, 1996. p. 6
 "VisionAire lured dreamers and investors". Aerospace Online, March 28, 2003. Retrieved January 9, 2011
 Visionaire Vantage VA-10". AINonline, March 1, 2003. Retrieved January 9, 2011
Warwick, James. "Single-minded". Flight International, May 14–20, 1997. pp. 54–55

External links
 

Vantage
1990s United States business aircraft
Forward-swept-wing aircraft
Single-engined jet aircraft
Very light jets
Aircraft first flown in 1996